Blue's Room is an American puppet television series spin-off from Blue's Clues. It was created by Traci Paige Johnson and Angela Santomero. The show aired on Nickelodeon as part of the Nick Jr. block, and it started out as short segments on Blue's Clues episodes in Season 6.

In March 2015, the entire series was made available as part of the Noggin app. After Noggin removed the series in 2020, Paramount+ (at the time CBS All Access) added the series to its streaming service in January 2021.

Premise
The series centers around the title character and host of the show, Blue, a happy-go-lucky female blue dog who talks and loves to sing, dance, and play with her new friends. Blue often interacts with her friends including Sprinkles, Blue's shy little brother who was introduced in the second season as the co-host; Roar E. Saurus (or simply Roary), a red-orange dinosaur who likes to practice roaring; Frederica, a purple doll who likes to pretend it's her birthday; and Polka Dots, a sea-foam plush toy who creates puzzles for others to solve. Together, they go on adventures, solve different problems, and use their imaginations.

Characters

Main
Blue (puppeteered by Leslie Carrara-Rudolph in Season 1, then Noel MacNeal in Season 2, and voiced by Victoria Pontecorvo) is the title character and hostess of the show. Blue is a happy-go-lucky female blue dog who is Sprinkles' older sister. She often greets others by shouting "Hi you!" and usually asks viewers open-ended questions. Her catchphrase is "Hoop-dee-doo!"
Polka Dots (originally puppeteered and voiced by Tim Lagasse in the pilot and shorts, then Peter Linz in Season 1 and James Godwin in Season 2) is Blue's best friend, a sea-foam plush toy who creates puzzles for others to solve.
Frederica (also known as Fred) (puppeteered and voiced by Cheryl Blaylock) is one of Blue's good friends who usually pretends that it is her birthday every day. She is a purple doll with orange hair.
Roar E. Saurus (also known as Roary) (puppeteered and voiced by Joey Mazzarino) is a red-orange dinosaur who likes to practice roaring.
Sprinkles (puppeteered and voiced by Joey Mazzarino) is Blue's baby brother and the co-host of the show added to the cast in the second season. Originally a plain white puppy, Sprinkles developed spots upon learning a few things. Sprinkles was created by two sisters, Ashleigh and Lacey Campion through a Nick Jr. competition. 
Doodleboard (originally puppeteered and voiced by Peter Linz in Season 1, then James Godwin in Season 2) is an easel who doodles and draws to tell the viewer to guess what the object is.
Dress Up Chest (originally puppeteered and voiced by Tim Lagasse in the pilot and shorts, then Tyler Bunch in the series) is a purple treasure chest who gives the others costumes to wear. He occasionally narrates story segments.
Boogie Woogie (puppeteered and voiced by Joey Mazzarino) is a jukebox who likes to sing and dance.
Silly Seat (puppeteered by Marc Petrosino and voiced by Jared Goldsmith) is a polka-dotted chair who tells silly jokes, crazy riddles and other funny things. He disappears from the supporting cast in the second season for unknown reasons.
Joe (portrayed by Donovan Patton; guest, Season 1; main, Season 2) is a live-action human and Blue and Sprinkles' caretaker who is often seen alongside Sprinkles.

Recurring
Handy Dandy Journal (voiced by Alex Hoffman) is an animated talking notebook whose face and design resembles that of Polka Dots. Blue writes and draws various thoughts about specific aspects of episodes in his pages.
Dictionary (voiced by Brianna Gentilella) is a yellow animated book containing many words and their definitions that Blue looks in almost every day to find out what the Word of the Day is. She has a face and has the ability to speak, similar to all other residents of Blue's Room.
Key (voiced by Jared Goldsmith) is an animated magical key Polka Dots keeps in his pocket. He opens Dress Up Chest's lock and is colored gold and orange.
Moona (voiced by Christiana Anbri) is an animated green and blue-colored fairy made of crescent shapes who tells Blue it is time to go home and appears at the end of each segment and episode.
Antonio (portrayed by Antonio Ortiz) is a young boy who sometimes visits Blue and her friends at the playroom.
Grandma Roary (puppeteered and voiced by Heather Asch) is the elderly grandmother of Roary.
Cookbook (voiced by Victoria Pontecorvo) is an animated red and white book full of food recipes.
ABC Puppy (puppeteered by Matt Vogel and voiced by Jared Goldsmith) is a pink puppy who lives in Alphabet City and loves letters.
Colors Puppy (puppeteered by Noel MacNeal and voiced by Jared Goldsmith) is an orange puppy who lives in Color Town and loves colors.
Princess of Numbers Puppy (puppeteered by Lisa Buckley and voiced by Christiana Anbri) is a purple puppy who lives in Numbers Kingdom and loves numbers.
Shapes Puppy (puppeteered by Pam Arciero and voiced by Lance Chantiles-Wertz) is a yellow puppy who lives in Shapes Forest and loves shapes.

Episodes

Series overview

Season 1 (2004–2005)

Season 2 (2006–2007)

Home media

Episodes on Nick Jr. compilation DVDs

See also 
 Blue's Clues
 Blue's Clues & You!
 Nick Jr.

References

External links 
 
 Blue's Room Common Sense Media review

Nick Jr. original programming
2000s American children's comedy television series
2000s Nickelodeon original programming
2004 American television series debuts
2007 American television series endings
American television spin-offs
American children's fantasy television series
American preschool education television series
American television series with live action and animation
American television shows featuring puppetry
2000s preschool education television series
Television series by 9 Story Media Group
Television series created by Angela Santomero
Television shows about dogs
English-language television shows